Jupiter Moon is a science fiction soap opera television series first broadcast by British Satellite Broadcasting's Galaxy channel in 1990. 150 episodes were commissioned and made, but only the first 108 were broadcast before the closure of BSB. Episodes 109–150 were first shown in the UK on the Sci Fi Channel in 1996.

Premise
The series is set in the year 2050 and concentrates on the space ship Ilea in semi-permanent orbit above the space city on Jupiter's moon Callisto. The Ilea is home to a university and many of the programme's main plot strands revolve around the lives of the students, helping the programme to deal with more mundane issues despite its far-flung setting. A secondary plot deals with an attempt to travel to the stars known as the Daedalus Project.

Cast

The cast included:

 Richard Derrington as Charles Brelan (Professor)
 Anna Chancellor as Mercedes Page (Post-Grad)
 Alison Dowling as Rebecca Harvey (Bursar)
 Carolyn Backhouse as Rosie Greenwood (Bursar)
 Andy Rashleigh as Eliot Creasy (Captain)
 Phil Willmott as Finbow Lewis (First Officer)
 Richard Hainsworth as Paul Fitzroy Drummond (Visiting Flight Officer)
 Christopher Simon as Christophe Chazalon (Doctor)
 Kathryn Hurlbutt as Harriet Bullock (Principal)
 Mark Jax as Paul Lockwood (Principal)
 Fiona Sinnott as Natasha Kovitsky (Captain)
 Charlotte Martin as the voice of Petra (Ship's Computer) 
 Nicola Wright as Victoria Frobisher (Student)
 Lucy Benjamin as Fiona McBride (Student)
 Daniel Beales as Daniel Wetherby (Student)
 Suzy Cooper as Melody Shaw (Student)
 Anna Pernicci as Anna Begani (Student)
 Karen Murden as Sara Robbins (Student)
 Fay Masterson as Gabriella Tanzi (Student)
 Jamie Glover as Philippe Gervais (Student)
 Jim Shepley as Jim Hawkins (Student)
 Cheryl Martin as Jenny Fletcher (Student)
 Richard Lintern as James Bromwich (Post-Grad)
 Ashley Russell as Jean-Francois Baul (Post-Grad)
 Jason Durr as Alex Hartmann (Engineer)
 Nick Moran as Zadock Wilkinson (Student)
 Peter Polycarpou as Jorge Amado (Captain of the Santa Maria)
 Caroline Evans as Chantal de Gracy (Post-Grad)
 Dominic Arnold as Piers Gilpin (Doctor)
 Andrew Read as Tim Shaw (Student)
 Nikki Brooks as Herlinde Gothard (Student)
 Terry Molloy as Pegleg Johnson (Commander)

Production
The series was created and produced by William Smethurst, a former long-standing editor of British radio soap The Archers, and was recorded at the studios of Central Television in Birmingham. Many of the cast and writers also came from The Archers.

The budget was £6m for 150 episodes.

Dr Bob Parkinson of British Aerospace designed the spaceship Ilea using European Space Agency/NASA projections.

It was a Primetime-Andromeda Production in association with BSB.

Name derivations
The space station Ilea was named after the then-recently abolished Inner London Education Authority. The character Phillipe Gervais was named after associate producer Jane Fallon's partner Ricky Gervais.

Broadcast
Jupiter Moon was commissioned to fulfill the perceived need for a soap opera in British Satellite Broadcasting's line-up and, as such, it was shown three times a week (on Mondays, Wednesdays, and Fridays at 6.30pm), with an omnibus edition at weekends on BSB's Galaxy channel from 26 March until 30 November 1990. 150 episodes were commissioned and made, but only the first 108 were broadcast by BSB. The series was curtailed owing to the merger between BSB and Sky Television plc and the subsequent cessation of the Galaxy channel. Sky was unable to continue the broadcast of the series, as, unlike BSB, Sky's transmission area covered various European territories where Jupiter Moon was already being shown. The later episodes were eventually shown in the UK on the Sci Fi Channel between 22 January and 19 February 1996, as part of a complete run of the series.

The programme was also broadcast by television channels in countries including Germany, Austria, Switzerland, Greece, Jamaica, Zambia, Gibraltar and several of the Gulf States.

The soap was screened on GBC TV (Gibraltar television) ahead of its premiere on BSB's own Galaxy channel. The soap was seen in the British Overseas Territory every Tuesday, Thursday, and Saturday at 7.30 pm, having taken the slot formerly occupied by EastEnders which had become too expensive for GBC TV.

List of episodes

Galaxy (1990)
The first UK broadcast of episodes 1–108 was on BSB's Galaxy channel in 1990.

Sci Fi Channel (1996)
The first UK broadcast of episodes 109–150 was on the Sci Fi Channel in 1996.

DVDs

United Kingdom
Episodes 1 to 60 were released by Oracle Home Entertainment on Region 2 DVD in the UK in 9 volumes.

United States
The entire series was released by Image Entertainment on Region 1 DVD in the US in 4 volumes.

See also

Project Daedalus – British space exploration project (1973–1978)

References

External links

Jupiter Moon at BBC Cult

1990 British television series debuts
1996 British television series endings
1990s British science fiction television series
1990s British television soap operas
British science fiction television shows
Fiction set on Callisto (moon)
English-language television shows
British television series revived after cancellation
Space adventure television series
Fiction set in 2050